The 1946 National Invitation Tournament was the 1946 edition of the annual NCAA college basketball competition.

Selected teams
Below is a list of the eight teams selected for the tournament.

 Arizona
 Bowling Green
 Kentucky
 Muhlenberg
 Rhode Island
 St. John's
 Syracuse
 West Virginia

Bracket
Below is the tournament bracket.

See also
 1946 NCAA basketball tournament
 1946 NAIA Division I men's basketball tournament

References

National Invitation
National Invitation Tournament
National Invitation Tournament, 1946
Basketball in New York City
College sports in New York City
Madison Square Garden
National Invitation Tournament
National Invitation Tournament
Sports competitions in New York City
Sports in Manhattan